New Albany is a borough in Bradford County, Pennsylvania, United States. It is part of Northeastern Pennsylvania. The population was 254 at the 2020 census.

Geography
New Albany is located in southern Bradford County at  (41.600441, -76.441720). It is surrounded by Albany Township but separate from it.

U.S. Route 220 passes through the borough, leading north  to Towanda, the county seat, and southwest  to Williamsport.

Demographics

As of the census of 2000, there were 306 people, 126 households, and 77 families residing in the borough. The population density was 642.3 people per square mile (246.1/km2). There were 147 housing units at an average density of 308.6 per square mile (118.2/km2). The racial makeup of the borough was 99.02% White and 0.98% Native American. Hispanic or Latino of any race were 0.65% of the population.

There were 126 households, out of which 27.8% had children under the age of 18 living with them, 44.4% were married couples living together, 10.3% had a female householder with no husband present, and 38.1% were non-families. 31.0% of all households were made up of individuals, and 15.9% had someone living alone who was 65 years of age or older. The average household size was 2.43 and the average family size was 3.01.

In the borough the population was spread out, with 25.5% under the age of 18, 8.8% from 18 to 24, 27.8% from 25 to 44, 22.9% from 45 to 64, and 15.0% who were 65 years of age or older. The median age was 37 years. For every 100 females there were 108.2 males. For every 100 females age 18 and over, there were 88.4 males.

The median income for a household in the borough was $29,444, and the median income for a family was $29,464. Males had a median income of $31,875 versus $23,750 for females. The per capita income for the borough was $15,209. About 12.7% of families and 15.0% of the population were below the poverty line, including 16.4% of those under the age of eighteen and 22.5% of those sixty five or over.

References

External links
New Albany Borough official website

Populated places established in 1819
Boroughs in Bradford County, Pennsylvania
1879 establishments in Pennsylvania